Kamala Nehru Park may refer to:

 Kamala Nehru Park, Mumbai
 Kamala Nehru Park, Pune